Frederik Nielsen and Ken Skupski were the defending champions but decided not to participate.
Brydan Klein and Dane Propoggia won the final 7–5, 2–6, [14–12] against Marin Draganja and Dino Marcan.

Seeds

Draw

Draw

References
 Main Draw

Guzzini Challenger- Doubles
2012 Doubles